Ernie Bot or Wenxin Yiyan 文心一言 in Chinese, full name Enhanced Representation through Knowledge Integration, is an AI chatbot service product of Baidu, under development since 2019. It is based on an Ernie 3.0-Titan large language model. It was released on March 17, 2023.

References

Chatbots
Baidu
Large language models